Hot 1027, formerly Classic FM 102.7 is a radio station in Johannesburg, South Africa. It was founded in 1997 and rebranded Hot 1027 on 1 July 2021.

Broadcast languages
English

Broadcast time
24/7

Broadcast area 
Greater Johannesburg
Nationally on DStv channel 857

Ownership breakdown
Indigo House Group Holdings(Pty)Ltd(51%)
IQ Group Holdings(Pty)Ltd (24.1%)
African Media Entertainment (AME) (19.9%)
Kelthar Holdings (Pty)Ltd (5%)

Listenership figures

References

External links
Classic FM South Africa website

Classical music radio stations
Radio stations in Johannesburg
Radio stations established in 1997